The National Great Blacks in Wax Museum is a wax museum in Baltimore, Maryland featuring prominent African-American and other black historical figures. It was established in 1983, in a downtown storefront on Saratoga Street.

The exhibits feature over 100 wax figures and scenes, including: a full model slave ship exhibit which portrays the 400-year history of the Atlantic Slave Trade, an exhibit on the role of youth in making history, and a Maryland room highlighting the contributions to African American history by notable Marylanders. The museum's co-founder, Dr. Joanne Martin, describes the importance of preserving Black history in this way, stating: 'everything else, it seems like a movie if you don't have a sense of exactly what people were fighting against.'

History
The National Great Blacks in Wax museum is Baltimore's first wax museum and the first wax museum of African American history in the nation. The museum was started as a grassroots operation by Dr. Elmer Martin and his wife Dr. Joanne Martin.

The idea of blacks in wax started with a few wax figures that were taken around to various schools, community centers, and malls. The museum was originally sponsored exclusively by Dr. Elmer Martin, his wife Dr. Joanne Martin, and donations from the community. In the early days, Dr. Elmer Martin was forced to ask his wife to sell her wedding ring to keep the moving exhibit going. However, it received national recognition in 1983 when the founding members were allotted grants, loans, and endowments to open a permanent exhibition. In 1988, Blacks in Wax received its permanent home on the 1600 block of North Avenue in the neighborhood of Oliver.

The site was originally home to a firehouse that was converted into a showhouse. In 2004, The Blacks in Wax Museum was recognized by the U.S. Congress as the "Nation's first wax museum presenting the history of great Black Americans" and subsequently became The National Blacks in Wax Museum.

People featured in museum
The following people have been depicted at the museum:

Akhenaton
Bishop Richard Allen
Willard Allen
Askia the Great
Benjamin Banneker
Ota Benga
Bilal
Rev. Andrew Bryan
Henry "Box" Brown
John Brown
Cripple Caesar
Bessie Coleman
General Benjamin O. Davis
W. E. B. Du Bois
Harlow Fullwood
Thomas Garrett
Jocko Graves
Jackie Robinson
Joe Louis
Jesse Owens
Prince Hall
Hannibal
General Daniel "Chappie" James
Toussaint L'Ouverture
Mother Mary E. Lange
Reginald F. Lewis
Makeda, Queen of Sheba
Queen Anne Njinga
Osborne Payne
General Colin Powell
Howard Rollins
Robert Samuel
Emmett Till
Harriet Tubman
Nat Turner
Madam C.J. Walker
Carter G. Woodson
Malcolm X
Martin Luther King Jr.
Marcus Garvey
Daymond John
Barack Obama
Imhotep
Elijah Muhammad
Noble Drew Ali
Bob Marley
Frederick Douglass
Rosa Parks
George Washington Carver
Ida B. Wells
Nelson Mandela
Winnie Madikizela-Mandela
Steve Biko
Sojourner Truth
Hayes Turner
Mary Turner

See also
African Americans in Baltimore
List of museums focused on African Americans

References

Sources 
National Blacks in Wax Museum. Accessed November 30, 2010.  
"National Great Blacks In Wax Museum." Accessed November 30, 2010.  
Wood, M. (2009), 'Slavery, Memory, and Museum Display in Baltimore: The Great Blacks in Wax and the Reginald F. Lewis. Curator: The Museum Journal, 52: 147–167. 2001.

External links
 National Great Blacks In Wax Museum - Official site
Great Blacks in Wax Museum on Google Street View

1983 establishments in Maryland
African-American history in Baltimore
African-American museums in Maryland
Museums established in 1983
Museums in Baltimore
Oliver, Baltimore
Wax museums in the United States